Manuela Roka Botey is the prime minister of Equatorial Guinea. She is the first woman to fill this role. Her appointment to Prime Minister by President Teodoro Obiang Nguema was announced on January 31, 2023. She succeeded Francisco Pascual Obama Asue in the office. Previously starting in 2020 she had been the minister for education. She is the vice dean of the National University of Equatorial Guinea's faculty of Humanities and Social Sciences.

References

Prime Ministers of Equatorial Guinea
Women government ministers of Equatorial Guinea
Living people
Year of birth missing (living people)
21st-century women politicians
Women prime ministers
Democratic Party of Equatorial Guinea politicians